Miguel Acosta Moreno (born September 4, 1975, in Mexico City), known as Miguel Acosta, is a Mexican football manager and former player. He was part of Necaxa's squad that finished third in the 2000 FIFA Club World Championship.

References

External links
 

1975 births
Living people
Footballers from Mexico City
Association football midfielders
C.D. Guadalajara footballers
Club Necaxa footballers
C.D. Veracruz footballers
Liga MX players
Mexican football managers
Liga MX Femenil managers
Mexican footballers